Tim Klaus Hoogland (born 11 June 1985) is a retired German footballer who last played as a defender or midfielder for Australian A-League club Melbourne Victory FC.

Career
Hoogland made his professional debut in the Bundesliga for Schalke 04 on 5 February 2005. He was substituted on in the 75th minute in a match against Hansa Rostock. After nine years with Schalke 04, Hoogland signed with 1. FSV Mainz 05.

On 12 January 2010, Hoogland confirmed that he had signed a contract with Schalke 04 returning him to his former club. His new contract kept him in Gelsenkirchen from 1 July 2010 through 30 June 2014.

For the 2012–13 season Hoogland was loaned out to VfB Stuttgart. After four Bundesliga appearances for Stuttgart he left the club after the season.

Hoogland signed for Championship team Fulham on a one-year contract on 30 June 2014 on a free transfer. He scored on his debut in a 2–1 defeat to Ipswich.

On 16 August 2019, Hoogland signed with Australian A-League club Melbourne Victory FC on a one-year contract.

Personal life
Hoogland attended the Gesamtschule Berger Feld.

Career statistics

Honours
 Bundesliga runner-up: 2004–05, 2006–07
 DFB-Pokal finalist: 2004–05, 2012–13; winner: 2010–11
 DFB-Ligapokal winner: 2005
 UEFA Intertoto Cup: 2004

References

External links
 
 

1985 births
Living people
People from Marl, North Rhine-Westphalia
Sportspeople from Münster (region)
People educated at the Gesamtschule Berger Feld
Association football defenders
Footballers from North Rhine-Westphalia
German footballers
Germany youth international footballers
Bundesliga players
2. Bundesliga players
English Football League players
TSV Marl-Hüls players
VfB Hüls players
VfB Stuttgart players
FC Schalke 04 players
1. FSV Mainz 05 players
FC Schalke 04 II players
Fulham F.C. players
VfL Bochum players
Melbourne Victory FC players